"Do It Well" (also known as "Doin' It Well") is a song recorded by American singer Jennifer Lopez for her sixth studio album, Brave (2007). It was written by Ryan Tedder, Leonard Caston, Anita Poree, and Frank Wilson. The song was produced by Tedder, with additional vocal production from Cory Rooney. "Do It Well" features influences by disco and hip hop music. The single received mostly positive reviews from music critics and reached the top forty in seventeen countries.

Composition 
"Do It Well" contains hip hop drum beats and disco sirens at the bridge. In the chorus, she sings to someone who caught her eye: "I ain't ever met a man like that / I ain't ever fell so far, so fast / You can turn me on, throw me off track / Boy you do it, do it / you do it, do it, well". The song is performed in the key of F minor with a tempo of 108 beats per minute.

Critical response
Chuck Taylor from Billboard magazine stated that the song is "a satisfying, flamethrowing pop–urban pearl. Not since 'Waiting for Tonight' has she served up a song with such potential to rally long-term play." Alex Fletcher from Digital Spy gave to the song 4 out of 5 stars, commenting that "It's brassy, sassy, (although certainly not classy) and it's here to replace Beyoncé's 'Crazy In Love' as everyone's favourite guilty dancefloor pleasure. Caryn Ganz from Rolling Stone wrote that "the track is her salvation on the album, since is the only track that lets J. Lo do her thing: dance." Nathan S. from "DJ Booth" deemed it as an "ass-shaking masterpiece she's wisely chosen as her first single. The tracks got that "classic" J-Lo feel, huge strings and horns pared over funk-based percussion, with just a dash of Latin flavor thrown in. It is as epic as a song designed for moving in the club can be, even if the song's about two-third's incredible production, one-third J-Lo's singing." Dan Gennoe from Yahoo! Music wrote that the song "may not be prime club material, but they all come with choruses and grooves guaranteed to make the housework go with a swing."

Michael Slezak from Entertainment Weekly wrote a mixed review, writing that "it finds Lopez's voice as tinny and feeble as ever, singing lyrics that may have sounded believable back in the early ’90s days of In Living Color, but now come off as a preposterous attempt to 'keep it real'." But he praised "the melody's as easy as it is catchy (perfect as "Jenny from the Block" for inebriated karaoke), and the beat demands a sumptuous choreographical feast of a video." 
Yahoo! Music wrote a negative review, stating that the song "sounds dated and recycled." Eric Henderson from Slant Magazine wrote that the song "is a fairly imaginative reworking of one of the many string breaks from Eddie Kendricks's "Keep On Truckin'."

Commercial performance 
It achieved moderate success on the music charts worldwide, and peaked at number 31 on the Billboard Hot 100, becoming Lopez's 12th U.S. top 40 single.
"Do It Well" has sold 538,000 paid digital downloads in the United States as of June 2013.

Music video
On August 8, 2007, it was announced that Lopez will be shooting a video for her new single "Do It Well" in Los Angeles on August 16–17.

The video debuted on MTV's TRL on September 17, 2007, on BET's 106 & Park on September 19, 2007, and at number ten on VH1 Top 20 Video Countdown on September 22, 2007. It has since climbed to number three on the former and number five on the latter. It premiered on the Indian broadcast of VH1 on October 1, 2007.

The video, directed by David LaChapelle, starts with Lopez walking down a street when she gets a message with a video on her PDA which is an SOS from a little boy captured and forced to work in the kitchen of an S&M nightclub on Union Street. She enters the club, pushing a doorman down the stairs after he questions her. She continues through the crowd, entering rooms looking for witnesses to the boy's whereabouts. She questions people and punches and slaps them to get information. While this is going on, there are scenes of Lopez dancing in a red dress and she does a dance routine in the breakdown. In the end she finally finds the little boy and as they leave another doorman bothers her. Lopez responds by kicking him over the banister. Then she and the little boy leave together.

Track listing

12" vinyl
"Do It Well" (album version) – 3:07
"Do It Well" (a cappella version) – 3:05
"Do It Well" (featuring Ludacris) – 3:34
"Do It Well" (instrumental version) – 3:04

Walmart CD single
"Do It Well" – 3:10
"Waiting for Tonight" – 4:08
"If You Had My Love" – 4:28
"Love Don't Cost a Thing" – 3:43
"Get Right" – 3:48
"Qué Hiciste" – 4:58

Ringle single
"Do It Well" – 3:07
"Qué Hiciste" (salsa remix) – 4:49
"Qué Hiciste" (Tony Moran radio mix) – 4:34

German basic CD single
"Do It Well" – 3:07
"Me Haces Falta" – 3:37

Australian CD single / German premium CD single
"Do It Well" – 3:07
"Me Haces Falta" – 3:37
"Como Ama una Mujer" – 6:01
"Me Haces Falta" (video)

Charts

Weekly charts

Year-end charts

Release history

See also
 List of number-one dance singles of 2007 (U.S.)

References 

2007 singles
2007 songs
Disco songs
Jennifer Lopez songs
Music videos directed by David LaChapelle
Number-one singles in Turkey
Songs written by Ryan Tedder
Songs written by Frank Wilson (musician)
Song recordings produced by Cory Rooney
Songs written by Leonard Caston Jr.